HMS Caledonia was a broadside ironclad of the . Originally laid down as a two-decker steam ship of the line of the Bulwark class, Caledonia was converted on the building stocks into an armoured frigate.

Service history
HMS Caledonia was not completed until July 1865 due to a delay in the delivery of her main armament. Once this was installed, she was commissioned as Second-in-Command of the Mediterranean Fleet, becoming the first ever armoured flagship of the Royal Navy.

She was temporarily withdrawn from service in 1866 for reconstruction which involved the addition of a poop deck. Following this, she was flagship of the Channel Fleet until 1867, when she was paid off for re-armament.

HMS Caledonia was flagship of the Mediterranean Fleet until 1869 (relieving , the last three-deck Royal Navy flagship) until 1872. In July 1871, she ran aground off Santorini, Greece. She was later refloated and taken in to Malta for repairs. She was a guardship in the Firth of Forth from 1872 until 1875. On 15 June 1873, Caledonia was in collision with the British ship Hogton Tower off St. Alban's Head, Dorset. Hogton Tower was severely damaged at the bows; Caledonia towed her in to Spithead, Hampshire. Caledonia had been serving as a Coastguard vessel at Birkenhead, Cheshire and was sailing to Portsmouth, Hampshire for a forthcoming inspection of the fleet by the Shah of Persia. She was paid off at Plymouth, and was laid up there until she was sold on 30 September 1886.

References

Sources
 
 
 Battleships-Cruisers.co.uk
 
 Baxter, James Phinney   The Introduction of the Ironclad Warship,   published Harvard University, 1933.
 
 Clowes, William Laird   Four Modern Naval Campaigns, Historical Strategical, and Tactical,  first published Unit Library, 1902, reprinted Cornmarket Press, 1970.
 
 
 
 Reed, Edward J   Our Ironclad Ships, their Qualities, Performance and Cost,  published John Murray, 1869.

 

Prince Consort-class ironclads
Bulwark-class battleships (1859)
Victorian-era battleships of the United Kingdom
Ships built in Woolwich
1862 ships
Maritime incidents in July 1871
Maritime incidents in June 1873